Marcel Horký (born 18 October 1973) is a retired Slovak football midfielder.

References

1973 births
Living people
Slovak footballers
FC Petržalka players
FC Spartak Trnava players
Panionios F.C. players
Budapest Honvéd FC players
1. FC Tatran Prešov players
SKN St. Pölten players
Association football midfielders
Slovak expatriate footballers
Expatriate footballers in Greece
Slovak expatriate sportspeople in Greece
Expatriate footballers in Hungary
Slovak expatriate sportspeople in Hungary
Expatriate footballers in Austria
Slovak expatriate sportspeople in Austria